Cooke's Tour is the fourth studio album by American singer-songwriter Sam Cooke, released in May 1960 in by RCA Victor. Cooke's Tour was the singer's first album on the RCA Victor label.

The album was remastered in 2011 as a part of The RCA Albums Collection.

Background
As Keen's marketing was limited, Sam Cooke began to shop around to other labels in February 1960. Interest was immediate from labels such as Atlantic and Capitol, but Cooke signed with Hugo Peretti and Luigi Creatore at RCA Victor, who offered a $100,000 advance. RCA Victor had previously signed Jesse Belvin, Della Reese and the Isley Brothers, and Peretti and Creatore were set on making Cooke an international album artist.

Cooke's Tour, recorded on March 2 and 3, 1960, is an "adventurous travelogue" that explores various territories around the world. Glen Osser wrote arrangements and conducted the album's orchestra, which was an R&B rhythm section and a fifteen-piece string ensemble. Cooke was closest to the album's final track, "The House I Live In," as he had just moved into his dream home in Leimert Park, Los Angeles.

Track listing
All songs arranged and conducted by Glen Osser.

Side one 
 "Far Away Places" (Joan Whitney Kramer, Alex Kramer) – 3:28
 "Under Paris Skies" (Hubert Giraud, Kim Gannon, Jean Dréjac) – 3:10
 "South of the Border (Down Mexico Way)" (Jimmy Kennedy, Michael Carr) – 3:10
 "Bali Ha'i" (Richard Rodgers, Oscar Hammerstein II) – 3:17
 "The Coffee Song (They've Got An Awful Lot of Coffee in Brazil)" (Bob Hilliard, Richard Miles) – 2:02
 "Arrivederci, Roma (Goodbye to Rome)" (Carl Sigman, Renato Rascel) – 2:47

Side two
 "London by Night" (Carroll Coates) – 3:34
 "Jamaica Farewell" (Irving Burgie) – 2:32
 "Galway Bay" (Dr. Arthur Colahan) – 3:00
 "Sweet Leilani" (Harry Owens) – 2:48
 "The Japanese Farewell Song" (Hasegawa Yoshida, Freddy Morgan) – 2:57
 "The House I Live In" (Lewis Allen, Earl Robinson) – 3:19

Personnel
All credits adapted from The RCA Albums Collection (2011) liner notes.
Sam Cooke – vocals
Al Hanlon, Charles Macey, Clifton White, Al Chernet – guitar
Lloyd Trotman, George Duvivier – bass guitar
Bunny Shawker – drums
George Gabor – percussion
Hank Jones, Morris Wechsler – piano
Jerome Weiner, Joe Small – flute
Hinda Barnett, Arcadie Berkenholz, James Bloom, Fred Buidrini, Morris Lefkowitz, Felix Orlewitz, Frank Siegfried, Ralph Silverman, Harry Urbont, Paul Winter, James Bloom, Anthony DiGirolamo, Ben Miller, David Nadien – violin
Isadore Zir – viola
Ray Schweitzer – cello
Abe Rosen – harp
Glenn Osser – arrangement, conducting
Ray Hall – recording engineer
Bob Witt – photography

Notes

External links 
 Songs of Sam Cooke: Main Page

1960 albums
Sam Cooke albums
RCA Victor albums
Albums produced by Hugo & Luigi
Albums arranged by Glenn Osser
Albums conducted by Glenn Osser